The 2007 United Indoor Football season was preceded by 2006 and was succeeded by 2008. It was the third season of the UIF.

Teams played either a 14 or 15 game schedule from March 23 until July 14, 2007.

The league champions, for the third year in a row, were the Sioux Falls Storm, who defeated the Lexington Horsemen in United Bowl III.  In doing so, they became the very first football team to have back-to-back perfect seasons.

Standings

 Green indicates clinched playoff berth
 Purple indicates division champion
 Grey indicates best league record

Playoffs

All-star game

 Located at the U.S. Cellular Coliseum in Bloomington, Illinois on Saturday, August 18

External links
 2007 UIF Season Stats

United Indoor Football seasons
2007 in American football